Cyanotrichite is a hydrous copper aluminium sulfate mineral with formula Cu4Al2[(OH)12|SO4]·2H2O, also known as lettsomite. Cyanotrichite forms velvety radial acicular crystal aggregates of extremely fine fibers. It crystallizes in the monoclinic system and forms translucent bright blue acicular crystal clusters or drusey coatings. The Mohs hardness is 2 and the specific gravity ranges from 2.74 to 2.95. Refractive indices are nα=1.588 nβ=1.617 nγ=1.655.

Occurrence and discovery
It is an oxidation product of primary copper mineralization in a weathering environment with abundant aluminium and sulfate. Associated minerals include brochantite, spangolite, chalcophyllite, olivenite, tyrolite, parnauite, azurite and malachite.

The main deposits are Cap la Garrone in the Var (France), Romania and Arizona (US). 

It was first described in 1839 from Moldova Nouă, Banat, Romania. The name is from Greek kyaneos for "blue" and triches for "hair" referring to the typical color and habit.  Its earlier name, Lettsomite, is taken from the name of William Garrow Lettsom (1804–1887), co-author of the 1858 Manual of the Mineralogy of Great Britain and Ireland.

References

 Palache, C., H. Berman, and C. Frondel (1951) Dana’s System of Mineralogy, (7th edition), v. II, p. 578–579. PDF file
Mineral galleries

Copper(II) minerals
Aluminium minerals
Sulfate minerals
Monoclinic minerals
Minerals in space group 12